Lehmer's conjecture, also known as the Lehmer's Mahler measure problem, is a problem in number theory raised by Derrick Henry Lehmer.  The conjecture asserts that there is an absolute constant  such that every polynomial with integer coefficients  satisfies one of the following properties:

  is an integral multiple of a product of cyclotomic polynomials or the monomial , in which case .

and then set

The smallest known Mahler measure (greater than 1) is for "Lehmer's polynomial"

for which the Mahler measure is the Salem number

It is widely believed that this example represents the true minimal value: that is,  in Lehmer's conjecture.

Motivation 
Consider Mahler measure for one variable and Jensen's formula shows that if  then  

In this paragraph denote　 , which is also called Mahler measure.

If  has integer coefficients, this shows that  is an algebraic number so  is the logarithm of an algebraic integer.

Lehmer noticed that  is an important value in the study of the integer sequences  for monic  . If  does not vanish on the circle then . If   does vanish on the circle but not at any root of unity, then the same convergence holds by Baker's theorem (in fact an earlier result of Gelfond is sufficient for this, as pointed out by Lind in connection with his study of quasihyperbolic toral automorphisms). As a result, Lehmer was led to ask
whether there is a constant  such that  provided  is not cyclotomic?,
or
given , are there  with integer coefficients for which ?
Some positive answers have been provided as follows, but Lehmer's conjecture is not yet completely proved and is still a question of much interest.

Partial results

Let  be an irreducible monic polynomial of degree .

Smyth  proved that Lehmer's conjecture is true for all polynomials that are not reciprocal, i.e., all polynomials satisfying .

Blanksby and Montgomery and Stewart independently proved that there is an absolute constant  such that either  or

Dobrowolski  improved this to

Dobrowolski obtained the value C ≥ 1/1200 and asymptotically C > 1-ε for all sufficiently large D.  Voutier in 1996 obtained C ≥ 1/4 for D ≥ 2.

Elliptic analogues

Let  be an elliptic curve defined over a number field , and let  be the canonical height function. The canonical height is the analogue for elliptic curves of the function . The elliptic Lehmer conjecture asserts that there is a constant  such that

 for all non-torsion points ,

where . If the elliptic curve E has complex multiplication, then the analogue of Dobrowolski's result holds:

due to Laurent. For arbitrary elliptic curves, the best known result is

due to Masser. For elliptic curves with non-integral j-invariant, this has been improved to

by Hindry and Silverman.

Restricted results
Stronger results are known for restricted classes of polynomials or algebraic numbers.

If P(x) is not reciprocal then

and this is clearly best possible.  If further all the coefficients of P are odd then

For any algebraic number α, let  be the Mahler measure of the minimal polynomial  of α.

Relation to structure of compact group automorphisms 
The measure-theoretic entropy of an ergodic automorphism of a compact metrizable abelian group is known to be given by the logarithmic Mahler measure of a polynomial with integer coefficients if it is finite. As pointed out by Lind, this means that the set of possible values of the entropy of such actions is either all of  or a countable set depending on the solution to Lehmer's problem. Lind also showed that the infinite-dimensional torus either has ergodic automorphisms of finite positive entropy or only has automorphisms of infinite entropy depending on the solution to Lehmer's problem. Since an ergodic compact group automorphism is measurably isomorphic to a Bernoulli shift, and the Bernoulli shifts are classified up to measurable isomorphism by their entropy by Ornstein's theorem, this means that the moduli space of all ergodic compact group automorphisms up to measurable isomorphism is either countable or uncountable depending on the solution to Lehmer's problem.

References

External links
http://wayback.cecm.sfu.ca/~mjm/Lehmer/ is a nice reference about the problem.

Polynomials
Theorems in number theory
Conjectures
Unsolved problems in number theory